A platen is a printing plate.

Platen may also refer to:

 Platen (Pomeranian family)
 Platen (surname)
 Platen, Luxembourg

See also
 Platten (disambiguation)